Steel Cold Winter (lit. "Girl") is a 2013 South Korean romance/mystery thriller film starring Kim Yoon-hye and Kim Shi-hoo. Directed by Choi Jin-sung, it premiered in the New Currents section of the 18th Busan International Film Festival and was released in theaters on November 7, 2013.

Plot
Yoon-soo was once a student at one of the best high schools in Seoul, but a trivial remark he made turns into a vicious rumor that leads his friend to commit suicide. Unable to bear the guilt, Yoon-soo attempts to kill himself. To help him recover, his family moves to Ijeon-li, a snow-covered village on a mountain. On the day of the move, Yoon-soo sees a mysterious young girl skating by herself on the frozen lake. Having started school in this small, rural town, Yoon-soo slowly finds peace within. Despite the villagers' kindness and his peers' ongoing fascination with him as a cool guy from the city, he keeps to himself. There is, however, one girl who gets Yoon-soo's attention: the class outcast Hae-won. The aloof Hae-won, who lives alone with her mentally disabled father, is viewed as a pariah by the entire village and constantly at the center of the townsfolk's gossip. As if seeing himself in her, he offers her sympathy and warmth, and Hae-won slowly opens up to him, feeling that he's the only one who understands and accepts her. But soon, Yoon-soo also becomes consumed by the brutal rumors surrounding Hae-won.

Cast
Kim Si-hoo as Seo Yoon-soo
Kim Yoon-hye as Eun Hae-won 
Moon Chang-gil as Yang Yi-chang (village foreman)
Lee Jang-yoo as Duk-man
Jo Han-chul as Doctor 
Woo Jung-gook as Kim Soon-kyung
Park Jin-woo as Man-suk
Yoon Kyung-ho as Teacher
Jung Doo-gyum as Seo Yoon-soo's father
Joo Yoo-rang as Seo Yoon-soo's mother
Park So-dam as Ji-yeon
Jang In-sub as Young-jae
Oh Hee-joon as Hyung-joon
Kim Kwang-seop as Kwang-seop
Lee Tae-hee as Young-joon
Chun Jung-ha as Young-joon's mother
Heo Tae-kyung as Yang Yi-chang's wife
Han Hee-jung as Seoul School home room teacher
Seo Hyun-woo as Math teacher
Jung In-gi as Myung-kwan (cameo)
Gi Ju-bong as Young-joon's father (cameo)

References

External links
 

South Korean romantic thriller films
South Korean mystery films
2010s romantic thriller films
Films directed by Choi Jin-sung
CJ Entertainment films
2010s mystery films
2010s South Korean films